The 1976 Victorian state election was held on 20 March 1976.

Seat changes
Following the redistribution, the following members of the Legislative Assembly contested different seats:
Tom Austin (Hampden, Liberal) contested Ripon.
Bill Baxter (Murray Valley, National) contested Benambra.
Norman Billing (Heatherton, Liberal) contested Springvale.
Hayden Birrell (Geelong, Liberal) contested Geelong West.
Esmond Curnow (Kara Kara, Labor) contested Bendigo.
Tom Edmunds (Moonee Ponds, Labor) contested Ascot Vale.
Jack Ginifer (Deer Park, Labor) contested Keilor.
Geoff Hayes (Scoresby, Liberal) contested Wantirna.
Norman Lacy (Ringwood, Liberal) contested Warrandyte.
Rob Maclellan (Gippsland West, Liberal) contested Berwick.
Llew Reese (Moorabbin, Liberal) contested Heatherton.
Tom Roper (Brunswick West, Labor) contested Brunswick.
Aurel Smith (Bellarine, Liberal) contested South Barwon.
Morris Williams (Box Hill, Liberal) contested Doncaster.
Bruce Chamberlain MLA (Dundas, Liberal) contested Western Province.
The following members of the Legislative Council contested different seats:
Michael Clarke (Northern, National) contested Bendigo Province.
Dolph Eddy (Doutta Galla, Labor) contested Thomastown Province.
Jock Granter (Bendigo, Liberal) contested Central Highlands Province.
Vernon Hauser (Boronia, Liberal) contested Nunawading Province.
Glyn Jenkins (South Western, Liberal) contested Geelong Province.

Retiring Members

Labor
Ron McAlister MLA (Brunswick East)

Liberal
Dorothy Goble MLA (Mitcham)
Jim MacDonald MLA (Glen Iris)
Edward Meagher MLA (Frankston)
John Rossiter MLA (Brighton)
Sir Edgar Tanner MLA (Caulfield)
Vernon Wilcox MLA (Camberwell)
Ray Wiltshire MLA (Syndal)
Murray Byrne MLC (Ballarat)
Sir Raymond Garrett MLC (Templestowe)
Graham Nicol MLC (Monash)

National
Tom Mitchell MLA (Benambra)
Ivan Swinburne MLC (North Eastern)

Legislative Assembly
Sitting members are shown in bold text. Successful candidates are highlighted in the relevant colour. Where there is possible confusion, an asterisk (*) is also used.

Legislative Council
Sitting members are shown in bold text. Successful candidates are highlighted in the relevant colour. Where there is possible confusion, an asterisk (*) is also used.

References

Psephos - Adam Carr's Election Archive

Victoria
Candidates for Victorian state elections